Skerik's Syncopated Taint Septet  is a self-titled first album recorded live in September 2002 in Seattle, Washington. It was recorded at the venue Owl & Thistle. The album received favorable reviews and while self described as "punk jazz" it also includes New Orleans influenced funk, bebop/hip-hop and rock crossing "time and musical culture without affectation, or worry."

Track listing 
 "Freakus Piniatus"
 "Philadelphia"
 "Let Me Be Your Voodoo Doll"
 "Runnin' Away"
 "Too Many Toys"
 "Bus Barn"
 "Christina"
 "They Did What to You?"
 "Morphine"

Musicians 
 Joe Doria – Hammond organ
 John Wicks – drums
 Steve Moore – trombone, Wurlitzer electric piano
 Hans Teuber – alto saxophone, flute
 Dave Carter – trumpet
 Craig Flory –  baritone saxophone
 Skerik – tenor and baritone saxophone

References 

Skerik's Syncopated Taint Septet albums
2003 live albums
Ropeadope Records live albums
Live instrumental albums